There are over 9,300 Grade I listed buildings in England.  This page is a list of these buildings in the county of Isle of Wight.

In the United Kingdom, the term listed building refers to a building or other structure officially designated as being of special architectural, historical, or cultural significance; Grade I structures are those considered to be "buildings of exceptional interest". Listing was begun by a provision in the Town and Country Planning Act 1947. Once listed, strict limitations are imposed on the modifications allowed to a building's structure or fittings. In England, the authority for listing under the Planning (Listed Buildings and Conservation Areas) Act 1990 rests with English Heritage, a non-departmental public body sponsored by the Department for Culture, Media and Sport; local authorities have a responsibility to regulate and enforce the planning regulations.

Buildings

|}

See also
Grade II* listed buildings on the Isle of Wight

Notes

References

External links

National Heritage List for England

 
Isle of Wight
Lists of listed buildings on the Isle of Wight